Liparis alboventer is a species of fish from the genus Liparis. The species was originally named Careproctus alboventer by Krasyukova in 1984. Very little is known about the fish except from the type specimens caught. It may be found in marine habitats at ten degrees Celsius in the South Kuril Strait of the Northwest Pacific.

References

Liparis (fish)
Fish described in 1984